Karl Hermann Brunn (1 August 1862 – 20 September 1939) was a German mathematician, known for his work in convex geometry (see  Brunn–Minkowski inequality) and in knot theory. Brunnian links are named after him, as his 1892 article "Über Verkettung" included examples of such links.

Life and work
Hermann Brunn was born in Rome, and grew up in Munich. He studied mathematics and physics at the Ludwig Maximilian University of Munich, graduating in 1887 with the thesis Über Ovale und Eiflächen (About ovals and eggforms). He habilitated in 1889.

References

Geometers
19th-century German mathematicians
20th-century German mathematicians
1939 deaths
1862 births
Italian emigrants to Germany
Scientists from Munich
Ludwig Maximilian University of Munich alumni